The 2008 AFC Women's Championship qualification is the qualification for the 2008 AFC Women's Asian Cup football competition. The matches were held from 24 to 28 March 2008. The AFC Women's Asian Cup is organised by the Asian Football Confederation.

First round
First leg played on 20 October 2007 in India. Second leg played on 27 October 2007 in Iran

Both legs played in Hong Kong. First leg on 20 October 2007, second leg on 22 October 2007.

First leg played on 20 October 2007 in Singapore. Second leg played on 27 October 2007 in Malaysia

Matches

Iran won 5–4 on aggregate.

Philippines won 4–3 on aggregate.

Malaysia won 2–1 on aggregate.

Second round

Group A

All matches were played in Ho Chi Minh City, Vietnam

Group B

All matches were played in Nakhon Ratchasima, Thailand

Goalscorers

References

2008 qualification